Bramberģe was a village in Latvia, in Glūda parish of Jelgava Municipality next to country highway V1059. The village was founded in the 17th century next to the Bramberģe estate.

After territorial reform in 2011, Bramberģe lost its village status.

See also 
Bramberģe Manor

References

Villages in Latvia
Jelgava Municipality